The 1992 Vermont gubernatorial election took place on November 3, 1992. After Republican Governor Richard Snelling died in office on August 13, 1991, Lieutenant Governor Howard Dean, a Democrat, took over for the remainder of his term. Incumbent Democrat Howard Dean ran successfully for election to a full term as Governor of Vermont, defeating Republican candidate John McClaughry.

Democratic primary

Results

Republican primary

Results

Liberty Union primary

Results

General election

Results

References

Vermont
1992
Gubernatorial
Howard Dean